Pucca may refer to:

 Pucca, a South Korean media franchise with international distribution
 Pucca (TV series), a Canadian TV show based on that media franchise
 Pucca Chocolate, a Japanese wafer candy
 Pucca or pukka, a category of Indian vernacular architecture
 Pucca housing, residences constructed using that technique
 PuCCa, Turkish writer

See also
 Pukka (disambiguation)